Alytana is a genus of moths of the family Crambidae. It contains only one species, Alytana aldabralis, which is found on the Seychelles, where it has been recorded from Aldabra and Assomption.

References

Spilomelinae
Monotypic moth genera
Moths of Africa
Crambidae genera
Taxa named by Eugene G. Munroe